Jai Prakash University (JPU) is a state university  located in Chhapra, Bihar, India. Initially serving the needs of higher and quality education of the people of Saran commissionary, it has completed its 29 years and has entered its 30th year. With 21 constituent colleges, 11 affiliated colleges and 23 proposed colleges including 10 professional colleges, it is offering courses at the undergraduate level and postgraduate level in most subjects.

It was established by the Government of Bihar in response to the needs of the people of Saran commissionary. The university was named in memory of freedom fighter Loknayak Jai Prakash Narayan.

The university is recognised by the UGC as a state university and is a member of the Association of Indian Universities, having jurisdiction over the Saran Division, comprising the three districts of Saran, Siwan and Gopalganj.

Campus
 of land has been acquired for a new campus. The university campus is about two km away from the main town. Jai Prakash Vishwavidyala (University) was established on 22.11.90 by the enactment of Section 3(b) of Bihar State Universities Act, 1976 with its headquarters at Chhapra, after carving it out from the then, Bihar University (now B.R.A. Bihar University).

Faculties 
The university has four main faculties:

Faculty of Social Sciences
 Department of Economics
 Department of Geography
 Department of History
 Department of Political Science
 Department of Psychology

Faculty of Science
 Department of Botany
 Department of Zoology
 Department of Chemistry
 Department of Physics
 Department of Mathematics
 Department of Agriculture

Faculty of Commerce
 Department of Commerce

Faculty of Humanities
 Department of Hindi
 Department of  English
 Department of Sanskrit
 Department of Urdu
 Department of Philosophy

Constituent colleges

In Saran district

 Rajendra College
 Jagdam College
 Jai Prakash Mahila College
 Ram Jaipal College
 Ganga Singh College
 Prithvi Chand Vigyan College
 HR College, Amnour
 Jaglal Choudhary College
 Yadunandan College, Dighwara
 Nand Lal Singh College
 Prabhunath College, Parsa
In Siwan district
 D.A.V Post Graduate College Siwan
 Vidya Bhawan Mahila College
 Ram Vilas Ganga Ram College
 Narayan College, Goreyakothi
 Hariram College, Mairwa
In Gopalganj district
 Kamla Rai College
 Mahendra Mahila College
 Bhola Prasad Singh College

Affiliated colleges 
There are 11 affiliated colleges under Jai Prakash University.
P.R. College, Sonpur, Saran (Deficit Grant)
Z.A. Islamia College, Siwan (Deficit Grant and Minority College)
Dr.P.N.Singh Degree College, Chapra
B.D.S.M. Mahila College, Salempur, Chapra
Lok Mahavidyalaya, Hafizpur Baniapur (Saran)
Deoraha Baba Shridhar Das Degree College, Kadna Garkha (Saran)
Daroga Pd.Rai Degree College, Siwan.
Mazhrul Haque Degree College, Tarwara (Siwan)
Desh Ratan Rajaendra Prasad Degree College, Ziradai (Siwan)
Shri Mahendra Das Degree College, Mathia Nechua,  Jalalpur (Gopalganj)
Shrikant Babu Degree College(SKB) Belbanwa kuchaikote (Gopalganj)
Mata Rojhni Devi Chhathu Ram Degree College, Mairwa (Siwan)

References

External links 
 Official website

Universities in Bihar
Saran district
Memorials to Jayaprakash Narayan
Educational institutions established in 1990
1990 establishments in Bihar